Wyndmere is a city in Richland County, North Dakota, United States. The population was 454 at the 2020 census.  Wyndmere was founded in 1883 and named after Windermere in England.  It is part of the Wahpeton, ND–MN Micropolitan Statistical Area.

Geography
Wyndmere is located at  (46.264182, -97.131413).

Demographics

2010 census
As of the census of 2010, there were 429 people, 192 households, and 117 families living in the city. The racial makeup of the city was 95.6% White, 0.2% Native American, 0.2% Asian, 2.6% from other races, and 1.4% from two or more races. Hispanic or Latino of any race were 6.1% of the population.

There were 192 households, of which 27.1% had children under the age of 18 living with them, 52.6% were married couples living together, 4.2% had a female householder with no husband present, 4.2% had a male householder with no wife present, and 39.1% were non-families. 35.9% of all households were made up of individuals, and 13.6% had someone living alone who was 65 years of age or older. The average household size was 2.23 and the average family size was 2.86.

The median age in the city was 43.6 years. 25.4% of residents were under the age of 18; 4.1% were between the ages of 18 and 24; 22.4% were from 25 to 44; 29.4% were from 45 to 64; and 18.9% were 65 years of age or older. The gender makeup of the city was 53.6% male and 46.4% female.

2000 census
As of the census of 2000, there were 533 people, 214 households, and 144 families living in the city. The racial makeup of the city was 97.56% White, 0.19% Native American, 0.19% Asian, 1.31% from other races, and 0.75% from two or more races. Hispanic or Latino of any race were 1.31% of the population.

There were 214 households, out of which 35.5% had children under the age of 18 living with them, 57.5% were married couples living together, 5.1% had a female householder with no husband present, and 32.7% were non-families. 27.1% of all households were made up of individuals, and 12.6% had someone living alone who was 65 years of age or older. The average household size was 2.49 and the average family size was 3.06.

In the city, the population was spread out, with 28.5% under the age of 18, 6.8% from 18 to 24, 27.6% from 25 to 44, 19.9% from 45 to 64, and 17.3% who were 65 years of age or older. The median age was 38 years. For every 100 females, there were 105.0 males. For every 100 females age 18 and over, there were 102.7 males.

The median income for a household in the city was $42,143, and the median income for a family was $45,833. Males had a median income of $32,054 versus $22,000 for females. The per capita income for the city was $15,288. About 1.4% of families and 5.8% of the population were below the poverty line, including 6.9% of those under age 18 and 6.5% of those age 65 or over.

Notable people

 Orin D. Haugen, World War II-era Army Colonel
 Chuck Klosterman, journalist
 Hans Langseth, owner of the longest beard recorded

References

External links
 Wyndmere Public Schools official website

Cities in Richland County, North Dakota
Cities in North Dakota
Populated places established in 1883
1883 establishments in Dakota Territory
Wahpeton micropolitan area